Gregory Plotkin is an American film editor and director, known for his work in horror films, including Get Out (2017), Happy Death Day (2017), Game Night (2018), and several films within the Paranormal Activity franchise. In 2015, he made his directorial debut with Paranormal Activity: The Ghost Dimension.

Filmography

Film

Television

References

External links 

 

Living people
American film editors
American film directors
Year of birth missing (living people)